Carim Danielo Adippe Quijano (born 15 May 1973, in Montevideo) is a Uruguayan professional footballer who plays for C.D. Victoria in Honduras. He has played for several clubs in Latin America, Europe and Asia.

Club career
Adippe has been a journeyman footballer, appearing for 22 clubs over a 16-year career. He began his professional career with C.A. Bella Vista. He spent one season with SK Slavia Praha in the Czech Gambrinus liga. Adippe played for Chacarita Juniors and Club Atlético Huracán in the Argentine Primera. He also appeared in five matches for C.S. Cartaginés in the Primera Division de Costa Rica.

References

 Profile at Blog Olimpista
 Interview with Adippe at Cable Sports

1973 births
Living people
Footballers from Montevideo
Uruguayan footballers
C.A. Bella Vista players
Montevideo Wanderers F.C. players
C.A. Progreso players
Huracán Buceo players
Club Nacional de Football players
Rampla Juniors players
Defensor Sporting players
Centro Atlético Fénix players
Miramar Misiones players
SK Slavia Prague players
FK Viktoria Žižkov players
Chacarita Juniors footballers
Club Atlético Huracán footballers
Club Atlético Belgrano footballers
Neuchâtel Xamax FCS players
Sport Boys footballers
C.D. Victoria players
C.S. Cartaginés players
Uruguay Montevideo players
Deportivo Marquense players
Czech First League players
Uruguayan expatriate footballers
Uruguayan expatriate sportspeople in Switzerland
Expatriate footballers in the Czech Republic
Expatriate footballers in China
Expatriate footballers in Argentina
Expatriate footballers in Switzerland
Expatriate footballers in Peru
Expatriate footballers in Costa Rica
Expatriate footballers in Guatemala
Expatriate footballers in Honduras
Liga Nacional de Fútbol Profesional de Honduras players
Association football forwards